Roman Červenka (born 10 December 1985) is a Czech professional ice hockey player currently playing for the SC Rapperswil-Jona Lakers of the National League (NL). He formerly played with Slavia Praha of the Czech Extraliga, Avangard Omsk and Lev Praha both of the Kontinental Hockey League (KHL). He was the leading goal scorer in the KHL in 2010–11 and was named to the All-Star team in 2011–12 before moving to North America after signing a contract with the National Hockey League (NHL)'s Calgary Flames. He played 39 games in the NHL during the 2012–13 season before returning to Europe.

Internationally, Červenka has played with the Czech Republic national team on several occasions, winning a bronze medal at the 2005 World Junior Ice Hockey Championships and gold and bronze at the 2010 and 2011 IIHF World Championships, respectively. Additionally, he represented his country as a member of the Czech team at the 2010 Winter Olympics.

Playing career
Červenka began playing with Slavia Praha's junior teams, playing for the under-18 team in 2000–01 and 2001–02, and the under-20 team in 2002–03 and 2003–04. During the 2003–04 season, he also made his Czech Extraliga debut, playing 15 games with the top-level team. After playing for various junior-level and 1 Liga teams during the 2004–05 and 2005–06 seasons, Červenka rejoined Slavia Praha in 2006–07. In 2008–09, he scored 59 points (28 goals and 31 assists) in 51 games.

Červenka has represented the Czech Republic with the national team on multiple occasions. He earned a bronze medal at the 2005 World Junior Championships. He also played at the 2009 IIHF World Championship and was selected to play for the 2010 Winter Olympics. At the time of the Olympic team selection, Červenka led the Extraliga with 55 points in 35 games.

On 25 May 2010, Červenka signed a two-year contract with Russian club Avangard Omsk of the Kontinental Hockey League (KHL). He earned a place on the left wing of the first line alongside his countryman Jaromír Jágr and established himself as a prolific KHL scoring forward. In his first season in the league, Červenka was selected to play in the Kontinental Hockey League All-Star Game, collecting more fan votes than any other skater in the league. Having scored 31 times in the 2010–11 season, Červenka earned the Top Goalscorer award from the KHL.

On 2 May 2012, Červenka signed a one-year contract with a base salary of $975,000 and a maximum of $3.775 million with the Calgary Flames of the National Hockey League (NHL). His debut with the team was delayed by the 2012–13 NHL lockout, during which he returned to play for Slavia Praha. He appeared in 9 games for the team, scoring 13 points. He left the team due to injury, then returned to action with Lev Praha of the KHL, but suffered another injury after only five games. He was further sidelined by a blood clot issue that left him out of the Flames' lineup to start the 2012–13 NHL season. Červenka missed the first three games of the season before making his NHL debut on 26 January 2013 in a 4–3 victory over the Edmonton Oilers. He scored his first NHL point (an assist) in the following game, against the Colorado Avalanche. Červenka's year with the Flames was disappointing largely due to missing training camp, subpar conditioning, struggling with the English language and coaches finding his defensive zone play to be a liability.

On 16 May 2013, Červenka returned to the KHL after signing a three-year contract with SKA Saint Petersburg. He left after two years and then spent the 2015–16 season with Piráti Chomutov of the Czech Extraliga; he scored 23 goals and provided 38 assists in 49 games during the regular season, ranking first in league scoring.

In March 2016, he signed with HC Fribourg-Gottéron of the Swiss National League (NL). After two seasons in Fribourg, on 23 May 2018, Červenka joined ZSC Lions on a one-year contract. On 20 June 2019, Červenka signed a one-year contract with his third Swiss club, SC Rapperswil-Jona Lakers, to remain in the NL.

Personal life
Červenka is Orthodox Christian, after Jaromír Jágr took him to churches in Omsk where he would be baptized. His younger brother Marek (born 1992) is a professional football player.

Career statistics

Regular season and playoffs

International

Awards and honours

References

External links

 

1985 births
Living people
Avangard Omsk players
Calgary Flames players
Czech ice hockey centres
HC Fribourg-Gottéron players
BK Havlíčkův Brod players
HC Kometa Brno players
Ice hockey players at the 2010 Winter Olympics
Ice hockey players at the 2014 Winter Olympics
Ice hockey players at the 2018 Winter Olympics
Ice hockey players at the 2022 Winter Olympics
HC Lev Praha players
Olympic ice hockey players of the Czech Republic
Piráti Chomutov players
SC Rapperswil-Jona Lakers players
HC Slavia Praha players
HC Slovan Ústečtí Lvi players
Ice hockey people from Prague
SKA Saint Petersburg players
Stadion Hradec Králové players
Undrafted National Hockey League players
ZSC Lions players
Czech expatriate ice hockey players in Switzerland
Czech expatriate ice hockey players in Canada
Czech expatriate ice hockey players in Russia